The name Frances has been used for eight tropical cyclones in the Atlantic Ocean and for one in the Australian region.

Atlantic Ocean 
 Hurricane Frances (1961): Caused flooding in Puerto Rico, peaked at Category 4 west of Bermuda, subtropical at Nova Scotia
 Tropical Storm Frances (1968): Travelled across the central Atlantic Ocean without affecting land
 Hurricane Frances (1976): Curved over the central Atlantic, affected the Azores as an extratropical storm
 Hurricane Frances (1980): Travelled up the central Atlantic Ocean without affecting land
 Hurricane Frances (1986): Briefly drifted over the western Atlantic but never affected land
 Hurricane Frances (1992): Threatened Bermuda but did not strike the island, then hit Spain as an extratropical storm
 Tropical Storm Frances (1998): A weak storm that caused flooding in East Texas and southern Louisiana
 Hurricane Frances (2004): A powerful Category 4 hurricane that struck the Bahamas, and later, as a Category 2 storm, moved extremely slowly over Florida, causing billions in damage

After the 2004 season, the name Frances was retired and replaced by Fiona in the 2010 season.

Australian region 
 Cyclone Frances (2017)

Atlantic hurricane set index articles
Australian region cyclone set index articles